World domination is the concept of a single power or ideology dominating the world. 

World domination or global domination may also refer to:

Music
 World Domination Enterprises, a UK independent rock band
 World Domination Recordings, a US record label
 World Domination (The Re-Visit), a continuation of The Pussycat Dolls tour - World Domination Tour

Albums
 World Domination (Band-Maid album), 2018
 World Domination (Kompressor album), 2001

Songs
 "World Domination", a 1986 hit single by the Belle Stars

Other
 Family Guy: Stewie's Guide to World Domination, a 2005 humor book about the TV show Family Guy written by producer Steve Callaghan
Age of Empires: World Domination, 2015 mobile real-time strategy game

See also 
 Global Conquest, a 1992 computer game
 Global Domination (video game), a 1993 computer game
 World Conquest (play-by-mail game)
 Superpower, a state with a leading position in the international system and the ability to influence events in its own interest by global projection of power
 World government, the notion of a single common political authority for all of humanity
 Global governance, the political interaction of transnational actors
 List of largest empires by maximum extent of land area occupied
 New World Order (conspiracy theory), theories whose theme is that a powerful and secretive elite of globalists are conspiring to eventually rule the world through an autonomous world government
 Risk (game) or La Conquête du Monde, a strategy board game
 Conquer the World, a compilation of strategy games by Microprose